Zhou Mi (Chinese name: 周覓, born ) is a Chinese singer, actor, songwriter, presenter, MC, and radio DJ based in South Korea and China. He is a member of the Boy band Super Junior's sub-unit Super Junior-M and SM Entertainment's project group SM the Ballad. Aside from group activities, he also participates in various television variety shows, radio shows, and dramas.

Film

Television series

Hosting programs

Radio shows

Variety shows

Notes

References

South Korean filmographies